Attemsiidae is a family of millipedes belonging to the order Chordeumatida. Adult millipedes in this family have 30 segments (counting the collum as the first segment and the telson as the last).

Genera

Genera:
 Allorhiscosoma Verhoeff, 1907
 Attemsia Verhoeff, 1895
 Biplicogonium Strasser, 1937

References

Chordeumatida